The name Enteng has been used in the Philippines by PAGASA in the Western Pacific.
 Severe Tropical Storm Omais (2004) (T0403, 06W, Enteng)
 Typhoon Nakri (2008) (T0805, 06W, Enteng)
 Tropical Storm Khanun (2012) (T1207, 08W, Enteng)
 Typhoon Namtheun (2016) (T1612, 15W, Enteng)
 Tropical Storm Jangmi (2020) (T2005, 05W, Enteng)

Pacific typhoon set index articles